Aviast Air Ltd. was a cargo airline based in Moscow, Russia. It operated scheduled and chartered services throughout Russia and the CIS mainly out of Domodedovo International Airport or, to a lesser extent, Yaroslavl Airport. The company was founded in 1992 and liquidated in 2011.

Fleet
The Aviast fleet included the following aircraft (at March 2007):
1 Antonov An-12
2 Ilyushin Il-76TD

Previously operated
As of August 2006, Aviast had also operated the following aircraft:
2 Antonov An-12
1 Ilyushin Il-76MD
1 Ilyushin Il-76TD

References 

Defunct airlines of Russia
Defunct cargo airlines
Companies based in Moscow
Airlines established in 1992
Airlines disestablished in 2011
Cargo airlines of Russia